Cyrille Isaac-Sibille is a French politician representing the Democratic Movement. He was elected to the French National Assembly on 18 June 2017, representing the Rhône's 12th Constituency.

References

 http://www2.assemblee-nationale.fr/deputes/fiche/OMC_PA722374

Living people
Deputies of the 15th National Assembly of the French Fifth Republic
Democratic Movement (France) politicians
21st-century French politicians
Year of birth missing (living people)